The Saracuruna River is a river in Rio de Janeiro state, located in southeastern Brazil.

It flows through the city of Duque de Caxias, to its mouth on Guanabara Bay.

See also
List of rivers of Rio de Janeiro

References
Brazilian Ministry of Transport

Rivers of Rio de Janeiro (state)
Duque de Caxias, Rio de Janeiro
Guanabara Bay